Francisco Fernández may refer to:

Nobility
 Francisco Fernández de la Cueva, 2nd Duke of Alburquerque (1467–1526), Spanish noble
 Francisco Fernández de la Cueva, 4th Duke of Alburquerque (1510–1563), Spanish noble
 Francisco Fernández de la Cueva, 7th Duke of Alburquerque (1575–1637), Spanish noble
 Francisco Fernández de la Cueva, 8th Duke of Alburquerque (1619–1676), Spanish military officer and governor of New Spain
 Francisco Fernández de la Cueva, 10th Duke of Alburquerque (1666–1724), viceroy of New Spain

Politics and law
 Francisco Montealegre Fernández (1818–1875), Costa Rican politician and businessman
 Francisco Fernández de Béthencourt (1850–1916), Spanish politician
 Francisco Fernández Ordóñez (1930–1992), Spanish politician
 Francisco Fernández Marugán (born 1946), Spanish politician
 Francisco Fernández de Cevallos (born 1947), Mexican politician
 Francisco Sanz Fernández (born 1952), Spanish politician 
 Francisco Javier Fernández (politician) (born 1969), Spanish politician

Sports
 Gallego (footballer) (Francisco Fernández Rodríguez, born 1944), Spanish international footballer of the 1960s
 Francisco Fernández Ochoa (1950–2006), Spanish alpine skier
 Francisco Fernández Moreno (born 1954), Spanish road bicycle racer
 Francisco Fernández (Chilean footballer) (born 1975), Chilean association football player
 Paquillo Fernández (Francisco Javier Fernández, born 1977), Spanish racewalker
 Francisco Fernández (water polo) (born 1986), Spanish water polo player

Others
 Francisco Fernández (artist) (1606–1646), Spanish painter
 Francisco Fernández Carvajal (born 1938), Spanish priest
 Francisco Moreno Fernández (born 1960), Spanish dialectologist and sociolinguist
 Francisco Fernández (supercentenarian) (1901–2012), Spanish supercentenarian

See also
 Francisco José Fernandes Costa (1867–1925), member of the Portuguese Republican Party
 Frank Fernández (disambiguation)
 Francisco Javier Fernández (disambiguation)